OcchioPinocchio (also Occhio Pinocchio) is a 1994 Italian fantasy comedy film directed by Francesco Nuti.

Cast
Francesco Nuti as Pinocchio/Leonardo
Chiara Caselli as Lucy Light
Joss Ackland as Brando Della Valle
Victor Cavallo as the director of the retirement house
Pina Cei as Colomba
Novello Novelli as Segugio

References

External links

OcchioPinocchio at Variety Distribution

1994 films
Films directed by Francesco Nuti
1990s Italian-language films
1990s fantasy comedy films
Italian fantasy comedy films
Pinocchio films
1990s Italian films